Brent Eleigh Woods is a  biological Site of Special Scientific Interest south-east of Lavenham in Suffolk.

This site consists of three separate areas, Spragg’s, Langley and Camps Woods. They are ancient woodland on calcareous clay soils. The main trees are oak and ash, and there are ponds and a stream.

The woods are private land with no public access.

References

Sites of Special Scientific Interest in Suffolk
Babergh District